The 2019–20 KHL season was the 12th season of the Kontinental Hockey League. There were 24 teams that competed in 62 regular season games. The season began with the Opening Cup on 1 September 2019, and the regular championship ran until 27 February 2020. The playoffs were scheduled to take place from 1 March through until 30 April. The All-Star Weekend took place over 18–19 January 2020.

Due to the 2020 coronavirus pandemic in Europe, the season was prematurely ended on 25 March 2020, midway through the playoffs.

The Russian Hockey Federation declared CSKA Moscow the Russian champions, SKA Saint Petersburg and Ak Bars Kazan silver medalists, and Dynamo Moscow bronze medalists based on regular season standings.

Season changes
For the 2019–20 season, the KHL originally announced that all 25 teams from the 2018–19 would return and continue without any changes to Divisions realignments. However the competition was reduced to 24 teams after Slovak based, HC Slovan Bratislava, announced that they would be withdrawing from the KHL to return to the Slovak Extraliga due to financial restrictions on 27 May 2019. With Slovan Bratislava's exit, Torpedo Nizhny Novgorod were moved from the Eastern Conference, to the Western Conference, reversing the move of the previous season. As a result, both Conferences consisted of 12 teams.

KHL World Games
The KHL announced the World Games project would continue for a second consecutive season with more information to be announced in July 2019. With the release of the season's schedule, new destinations of Davos, Shenzhen and Almaty were scheduled to host games.

Smart pucks
Smart puck technology, backed up with chips in players' jerseys, was used in all KHL games in the coming season. The new technology was trialled in the All-Star Game in Kazan last season and was also used in regular season games in Helsinki. Every arena in the league installed sensors capable of collecting information from the chips 100 times a second. That information was available to various users and coaches in real time, giving-up-to-the-second details of the players’ speed, the distance covered in each shift, the speed and location of each shot and much more.

The KHL is the first league in the world to implement this technology across the board.

Teams
The 24 teams were split into four divisions: the Bobrov Division and the Tarasov Division as part of the Western Conference, with the Kharlamov Division and the Chernyshev Division as part of the Eastern Conference.

League standings
Each team played 62 games, playing their divisional opponents four times, non-divisional conference rivals three times, and non-conference opponents twice.

Points were awarded for each game, where two points were awarded for all victories, regardless of whether it was in regulation time, in overtime or after game-winning shots. One point was awarded for losing in overtime or game-winning shots, and zero points for losing in regulation time. At the end of the regular season, the team that finished with the most points was crowned the Continental Cup winner.

Western Conference

Eastern Conference

Gagarin Cup playoffs

Ak Bars Kazan were the Eastern Conference regular season winners with 93 points. It was determined following a 5–3 victory over closest challengers Avangard Omsk at TatNeft Arena. CSKA Moscow were the Western Conference regular season winners, and winners of the Continental Cup with 94 points. It was determined following a 6–0 victory over HC Sochi at CSKA Arena.

Final standings
Following the announcement that the season was prematurely ended on 25 March 2020, a decision of the final league standings was announced to be made at a later date. On 7 May 2020, it was announced that the eight teams that had qualified for the second round of the playoffs would be ranked ex aequo.

At the same time, the Russian Hockey Federation declared CSKA Moscow the Russian champions, SKA Saint Petersburg and Ak Bars Kazan silver medalists, and Dynamo Moscow bronze medalists based on regular season standings.

Statistics

Scoring leaders

The following players led the league in points, at the conclusion of the regular season. If two or more skaters are tied (i.e. same number of points, goals and played games), all of the tied skaters are shown.

Leading goaltenders
The following goaltenders led the league in goals against average, at the conclusion of the regular season.

Awards

Players of the Month
Best KHL players of each month.

References

External links
 

 
Kontinental Hockey League seasons
KHL
KHL season